Pharaoh is an adventure module for the Dungeons & Dragons fantasy role-playing game. The module was published in 1982 by TSR, Inc. for the first edition Advanced Dungeons & Dragons rules. It formed the first of the three-part Desert of Desolation module series. The module was written by Tracy and Laura Hickman; Tracy Hickman would later go on to help create the Dragonlance campaign setting.

Plot summary
The original Daystar West edition of the scenario involves a tomb which is rumored to be theft-proof.  At the start of the adventure, the player characters are confronted by the ghost of a long-dead Pharaoh, cursed to wander the sands of his now-deserted land for time on end, in search of the ones who can break the curse and free him from this world.  The characters soon find themselves searching for items which will end the curse and bring them wealth and power. There are five levels to explore in the pyramid, and a large exterior temple.

The TSR version of Pharaoh is an Egyptian-styled adventure that includes a pyramid map and a trap-filled maze. In Pharaoh, the player characters (PCs) are driven into the desert for a crime they did not commit. The characters journey to the sunken city of Pazar and from there must travel to the haunted tomb of an ancient pharaoh. While in the desert, the characters encounter the spirit of Amun-Re, a pharaoh cursed to wander the desert until his tomb is robbed. Amun-Re begs the PCs to remove his staff of ruling and Star Gem from his tomb to break his curse. The tomb was built to be thief-proof and has so far lived up to its reputation.  While in Amun-Re's pyramid, the characters can use an item called the dome of flight to control or reverse gravity; carelessness can cause them to fall upwards. The palm trees in this room bear exploding fruit. The characters also encounter a maze with numerous traps. The module contains wilderness maps, and a number of smaller adventures as well.

Publication history
In 1977, Tracy Hickman (co-creator of the Dragonlance campaign setting) and Laura Hickman were married. Soon after, while living in Provo, Utah, they wrote the adventures Pharaoh and Ravenloft.  The Hickmans decided to privately publish the first two adventures they had designed together, Rahasia and Pharaoh, which earned them a reputation on a local level. Pharaoh was published as part of the "Night Ventures" line of scenarios in 1980, by DayStar West Media Productions, as a sixty-eight-page book. The module was designed to be played and completed with a satisfactory conclusion with a couple of sessions of playing time. However, disaster struck when Tracy went into business with an associate who went bad, leaving the Hickmans to cover thirty-thousand dollars in bad checks. They were driven into bankruptcy, and Tracy Hickman decided to sell their modules to TSR, "literally so that I could buy shoes for my children". TSR decided not only to buy the modules, but hire Tracy as a game designer:
 "They said it would be easier to publish my adventures if I was part of the company. So, we made the move from Utah to Wisconsin."
In 1982, TSR published Pharaoh as a thirty-two-page booklet with two outer folders, for the first edition of AD&D. It was designed for 6-8 player characters of levels 5-7 and formed the first of the three-part Desert of Desolation module series. The cover art for Pharaoh was provided by Jim Holloway.

Tracy Hickman noted that the module Pharaoh can teach positive lessons about the concepts of good to youth, saying of the eponymous Pharaoh character, the "apparent misery to which this figure was condemned by his own lust for wealth continues to teach the value of deeds over possessions to all who play that game today."

Reception
Harley Bates reviewed the Daystar West edition of the adventure in The Space Gamer No. 54. He commented that "It's a nice break from standard ongoing campaigns, and gives both players and judges attainable goals in shorter steps." Bates added that "The inhabitants of the tomb are far from the ordinary fare and provide the players and the judge with fascinating role-playing.  There are many clues and puzzles scattered throughout the adventure.  All in all, it's a very tightly-woven adventure which should be enjoyable for all involved." He criticized that "The only real flaw is that there are too many typographical errors.  Most of the play supplements available today suffer from this.  Couldn't designers and publishers spend just a little more time proofreading?" Bates concluded his review by stating: "Given the overall quality we are presented in this product, the typos can be overlooked [...] It's a great buy, considering the time, effort, and thought evident throughout."

Dungeon Master for Dummies lists Pharaoh as one of the ten best classic adventures.

Doug Cowie reviewed Pharaoh very favorably for Imagine magazine. He noted the "first rate cover art" and the overall "value-for-money feel" of the module. He also praised the well-designed layout and the standardized approach to describing encounter areas. Cowie expected that those who played this "dangerous, tricky and entertaining" module would wish to continue with the sequels I4 and I5. One month later, Doug Cowie also reviewed Oasis of the White Palm favorably for Imagine magazine. He found it a “tough test” for the players and praised the “first rate cover art” and “lively illustrations” inside. Cowie found I4 a “mainstream AD&D adventure with plenty of treasure, traps and tricks” situated mostly in “traditional room/corridor environments”. But according to him it also offers “plenty of interesting goings-on between NPC individuals and groups” so that the players find themselves in a “dynamic society”. Cowie cautioned that some encounters are quite complicated so the DM needs to study the module closely before running it. Cowie felt I4 to be an “excellent, varied module” that offered “excitement, depth and tension”. He concluded his review by calling it “a must for those who have played I3 and highly recommended for anyone else.”

Pharaoh and Oasis of the White Palm were reviewed in White Dwarf, No. 45 by Jim Bambra, who gave both modules 10 of out 10 overall. Bambra felt that Pharaoh involved "some excellent adventure situations," and said that the "design of the pyramid is very imaginative and the use of wall carvings to provide background information to the adventure really brings it to life making it more than just a collection of rooms." He felt that the presentation of both modules was excellent, and liked the new format, which utilized a short paragraph to quickly describe how the adventure should be run. He felt that this system, which also included distinct listings of traps, tricks, monsters, and treasure, "makes it far easier to find information quickly and reduced the chance of leaving something important out in the heat of play." Bambra concluded by stating that these "are both excellent adventures, they are imaginative, colourful and challenging."

The module was considered as a milestone in dungeon design because since that moment they needed to have « an overarching, cohesive plot, usually with epic overtones. Dungeons were not silly little mazes, but structures that made sense architecturally. And encounters had to make sense within the overall plot. » This new movement of dungeon design was called the « Hickman Revolution » by James Maliszewski.

Credits
Design: Tracy & Laura Hickman
Editing: Curtis Smith
Cover Art: Jim Holloway. .

Notable nonplayer characters 
 Pasha of the Efreet, vizier of the fire Sultan

New Monsters
Dustdiggers
Symbaysns
Thunder herders
Thune Dervishes

See also
 List of Dungeons & Dragons modules

References and Footnotes

Pharaoh
Role-playing game supplements introduced in 1982